This is a list of the National Register of Historic Places listings in Howard County, Texas.

This is intended to be a complete list of properties listed on the National Register of Historic Places in Howard County, Texas. There are four properties listed on the National Register in the county. Two properties are Recorded Texas Historic Landmarks, and one is also a State Antiquities Landmark.

Current listings

The locations of National Register properties may be seen in a mapping service provided.

|}

See also

National Register of Historic Places listings in Texas
Recorded Texas Historic Landmarks in Howard County

References

External links

Howard County, Texas
Howard County
Buildings and structures in Howard County, Texas